Onuka may refer to:

Onuka Station, a railway station in Hiroshima Prefecture, Japan
Mohammed Abul-Salam Onuka, a Nigerian soldier who served as Military Administrator of Edo State
Onuka (band), a Ukrainian electronic music group